Kachychy (Belarusian: Ка́чычы, Kačyčy; Russian: Качичи; Polish: Kaczyce) is a village in Belarus, in the Karelichy Raion of Grodno Region.

History 
In the interwar period, the village was situated in Poland, in the Nowogródek Voivodeship, in the Nowogródek County, in the Karelichy Commune. After the Soviet invasion of Poland in 1939, the village became part of the BSSR. In the years 1941-1944 it was under German occupation. Then the village was again in the BSSR. From 1991 in the Republic of Belarus.

Battle of Rowiny 
In January 1945, the battle of Rowiny between the Home Army and the NKVD internal troops took place in this area. 89 Poles, soldiers of the "Tur" and "Grom" units of the Self-Defense of the Vilnius Land were killed. They were buried near Kachychy. In October 2021, the tombstone was devastated, and in July 2022 it was destroyed by the Belarusian authorities.

References

Villages in Belarus